This is a list of active and extinct volcanoes in Greece.

References 

 Schwandner, F.M. (1998). Polyphase Meso-Cenozoic Structural Development on Poros Island (Greece). Bulletin of the Geological Society of Greece 32 + (1): 129-136. 
 Aegina island History.

Greece
 
Volcanoes